Xavier Iacovelli (born 31 March 1981) is a French politician who has been a member of the French Senate for Hauts-de-Seine since 2017.

Career 
He was the vice president of the La République En Marche group in the Senate.

He is the Secretary General of Territories of Progress.

References 

1981 births
Living people
Senators of Hauts-de-Seine
21st-century French politicians
French Senators of the Fifth Republic
Socialist Party (France) politicians
La République En Marche! politicians
People from Suresnes
Politicians from Île-de-France
French people of Italian descent